Oreonectes guananensis is a species of cyprinid of the genus Oreonectes. Described in 2011, it has not been classified on the IUCN Red List. It inhabits Guangxi, China and is considered harmless to humans.

References

Cyprinid fish of Asia
Fish described in 2011
Freshwater fish of China